Kilmurry means "Church of Mary" in Irish, and is the name of several villages or parishes. It may refer to:

 Kilmurry GAA, a Gaelic football club based in the division of Muskerry of Cork GAA in the county of Cork
 Kilmurry Civil parish, in the barony of Muskerry West, County Cork, Ireland
 Kilmurry Ibrickane (civil parish), in the barony Ibrickane in County Clare
 Kilmurry Ibrickane GAA, a Gaelic Athletic Association club in County Clare
 Kilmurry McMahon, in the barony of Clonderlaw, Clare
 Kilmurry-Negaul, near Sixmilebridge, Clare
 Kilmurry railway station, on the Cork and Muskerry Light Railway in County Cork